A gentleman's agreement is an informal agreement.

It may also refer to:
 Gentlemen's Agreement of 1907 between the United States and Japan
 Gentlemen's Agreement of 1956 between leaders of the Andhra State and the Telangana region, leading to the formation of the state of Andhra Pradesh in India
 Gentleman's Agreement (novel)
 Gentleman's Agreement, the 1947 film adaptation, starring Gregory Peck and Dorothy McGuire
 A Gentleman's Agreement, a 1918 silent film
 Gentlemen's Agreement (film), a 1935 British film
 Gentleman's Agreement (album), a 1983 jazz album by George Adams and Dannie Richmond